The Shire of Rosedale was a local government area stretching between the towns of Traralgon and Sale, in the Gippsland region of Victoria, Australia.

History

Rosedale was incorporated as a road district on 26 February 1869, and became a shire on 17 February 1871. It annexed part of the Shire of Alberton on 20 May 1914.

On 2 December 1994, the Shire of Rosedale was abolished, and along with the City of Sale and parts of the Shires of Alberton and Avon, was merged into the newly created Shire of Wellington. The Boole Poole Peninsula south of Metung was transferred to the newly created Shire of East Gippsland, while the Glengarry and Toongabbie districts north of Traralgon were transferred to the newly created Shire of La Trobe.

Wards

The Shire of Rosedale was divided into three ridings, each of which elected three councillors:
 Central Riding
 North Riding
 East Riding

Towns and localities
 Cowwarr
 Denison
 Glengarry
 Golden Beach
 Hiamdale
 Kilmany
 Loch Sport
 Longford
 Nambrok
 Rosedale*
 Seaspray
 Stradbroke
 The Lakes National Park
 Toongabbie
 Willung South

* Council seat.

Population

* Estimate in the 1958 Victorian Year Book.

References

External links
 Victorian Places - Rosedale Shire

Rosedale